Wayne Hockley (born 6 September 1978) is an English former professional footballer.

Career
Hockley was born in Paignton, Devon and joined Torquay United as a trainee, having previously played for local side Stoke Gabriel. He made his debut on 15 March 1997, as a substitute for Mark Hawthorne in Torquay's 3–1 defeat away to Scarborough, missing an open goal within a minute of taking to the pitch. He played once more that season, this time as a substitute for Andy McFarlane in Torquay's 2–1 defeat away to Doncaster Rovers and began the following season on a monthly contract.

He left Torquay in September 1997 after manager Kevin Hodges only offered him a further month rather than a longer-term contract and rejoined his former club Stoke Gabriel. He was the top scorer for Dartington Sports Club in the 1998–99 season. In March 2000 he was playing for Galmpton United, but by July 2001 was back with Dartington S.C., playing in a friendly against Torquay United in a game in which he was marked by his younger brother Matt, who was also a professional with Torquay United, making over 200 appearances for the club between 2000 and 2008.

References

External links

1978 births
Living people
People from Paignton
English footballers
Torquay United F.C. players
English Football League players
Association football forwards